The MK Indy is a Lotus 7 replica based on the Locost principle, built by MK Sportscars in Maltby, Rotherham. The Indy has an independent rear suspension using the differential and drive shafts from a Ford Sierra.  It uses many other components from the Sierra, including front hubs and steering rack.  Further, it can be fitted with any of a variety of engines, the most popular choices being the Ford Pinto engine from the Sierra for its ease and cheapness or a large motorcycle engine for its light weight and high rpm.

According to figures given to the magazine Total Kit Car 200 Indys are built a year.

See also
 List of car manufacturers of the United Kingdom

References

External links 
 

Lotus Seven replicas
Cars of England